is a Japanese actor and singer. He is best known as being a member of the Japanese idol groups Sexy Zone and Yuma Nakayama w/B.I.Shadow.

Career
Nakajima was part of B.I.Shadow. In 2008, B.I.Shadow was formed as a Johnny's Jr. group. At that time the members were: Kento Nakajima, Fuma Kikuchi, and Misaki Takahata. During that year, they acted in the drama Scrap Teacher.
He is one of the chosen personalities to represent the network WOWOW during the broadcast of 92nd Academy Awards. He studied English for this occasion and showed wonderful English-speaking skills.

Personal life
Often fondly called as "Kenty," Nakajima is an only child and was raised by his mother to have a gentleman's attitude or "lady first" principle. He loves to play the piano and often performs with it during their concerts. He updates his blog KenTeaTime or ‘KTT’ on Johnny’s web everyday, reporting his daily life to his fans. He is a big fan of the manga Kimetsu no Yaiba and he can't be stopped every time he starts talking about it. He coined the term "Sexy Lovers" or セクラバ (sekurabas) for Sexy Zone fans. He owns a toy poodle he named, "Bonita" or "Boni-chan."

He graduated with a bachelor's degree in Sociology at Meiji Gakuin University.

Filmography

TV series

Film

Animation series

See also 
 Sexy Zone
 Yuma Nakayama w/B.I.Shadow

References

External links 

 Sexy Zone's Official Site 
 Johnny & Associates' Official Website
 

1994 births
Living people
21st-century Japanese male actors
Japanese idols
Japanese male pop singers
Singers from Tokyo
Meiji Gakuin University alumni
21st-century Japanese singers
21st-century Japanese male singers